Malaysia competed in the 1986 Asian Games in Seoul, South Korea from 20 September to 5 October 1986. Malaysia ended the games at 10 overall medals. Abdul Hamid Omar was the head of the delegation.

Medal summary

Medals by sport

Medallists

Athletics

Women
Track event

Badminton

Men's team
Quarterfinal

Basketball

Men's tournament

Ranked 5th in final standings

Women's tournament

Ranked 4th in final standings

Bowling

Men

Field hockey

Men's tournament
Group B

Semifinal

Bronze medal match

Ranked 4th in final standings

Women's tournament

Ranked 4th in final standings

Football

Men's tournament
Group C

Ranked 15th in final standings

Shooting

Mixed

Swimming

Women

Taekwondo

Men

References

Nations at the 1986 Asian Games
1986
Asian Games